Rizal, officially the Municipality of Rizal,  is a 3rd class municipality in the province of Occidental Mindoro, Philippines. According to the 2020 census, it has a population of 40,429 people.

History

Before the coming of the Spaniards to the Philippines, the area which comprises the municipality of Rizal at present, was covered with forests. Later on, a few families of tribal Filipinos, known as Ratagnons, settled near the mouth of a river which was called Bogsanga. According to the Hanunoos, another group of tribal Filipinos, living on the hills, about ten kilometers west of Bogsanga, the original name of the river was Bisanga, a word from their dialect which means "It branched out." They gave the river that name for the said body of water came from two sources.

Political leaders of San Jose and Occidental Mindoro felt that the barrios between Busuanga and Lumintao River should be created as another municipality. In anticipation of the creation of a new town, residents of Barrio Limlim decided to change the name of their community to Rizal. They expressed their desire that their barrio would be made as the center of the town.

When Pedro Medalla Sr. was elected in 1965 as representative of Occidental Mindoro, one of the bills he filed in Congress was the creation of the municipality of Rizal. Through his effort, Republic Act No. 5460 was passed by Congress and signed into law by President Ferdinand Marcos. Rizal became a municipality on April 3, 1969. Ten barrios composed the new town. They were Adela, Rumbang, Salvacion, Magui, Magsikap, San Pedro, Santo Nino, Pitogo, Aguas and Rizal (Limlim).

Geography

Barangays
Rizal is politically subdivided into 11 barangays.

 Adela
 Aguas
 Magsikap
 Malawaan
 Pitogo
 Rizal
 Rumbang
 Salvacion
 San Pedro
 Santo Niño
 Manoot

Climate

Demographics

Economy

References

External links

Rizal Profile at PhilAtlas.com
[ Philippine Standard Geographic Code]
Philippine Census Information
Local Governance Performance Management System

Municipalities of Occidental Mindoro